Xavier Maurice McDaniel (born June 4, 1963), nicknamed "X-Man", is an American retired professional basketball player who, at 6 ft 7 in, played both small forward and power forward. He played in college at Wichita State University.

High School career 
McDaniel attended A.C. Flora High School in Columbia, South Carolina. During his time there, he helped the school basketball team win the state championship in 1981.

College career
While at Wichita State, McDaniel was the first person to lead the nation in both rebounding and scoring in the same season. In college, McDaniel began to shave both his head and his eyebrows to look more intimidating. He continued this all throughout his pro career.

For his first two seasons at Wichita State, the Shockers were on NCAA probation. He was a teammate his freshman year of future NBA players Antoine Carr and Cliff Levingston. When Levingston left for the NBA, McDaniel became a starter and averaged 18.8 points and 14.4 rebounds as a power forward opposite Carr. The following season, Carr left, and McDaniel raised his scoring average to 20.6 points per game and was the Missouri Valley Conference MVP. He then led the nation in scoring (27.4) and rebounding (15.0) his senior season becoming the first player to do so. Xavier McDaniel was inducted into the Missouri Valley Conference Hall of Fame in 1998.

McDaniel was a consensus First Team All American during his senior year at Wichita State as well as the NCAA leader in points and rebounds during the same year.

Professional career

Seattle SuperSonics
McDaniel was selected by the Seattle SuperSonics in the first round (4th overall) of the 1985 NBA draft and became an instant starter. He averaged 17.1 points per game and finished second in the NBA Rookie of the Year balloting to Patrick Ewing. His second season, he was one of a trio of 20 ppg scorers with the SuperSonics along with Dale Ellis and Tom Chambers. The SuperSonics made it to the Western Conference finals that season, before losing to the Los Angeles Lakers. In that series, on May 23, 1987, McDaniel scored a career-high 42 points and grabbed 10 rebounds in a 122-121 loss. The following season, on January 20, 1988, McDaniel scored 41 points and grabbed a career-high 19 rebounds in a win over the Knicks. On April 6, 1989, McDaniel scored 37 points, grabbed 8 rebounds, and recorded 6 assists in a 126-119 loss to the Phoenix Suns. He averaged over 20 points per game for his final three seasons as a Sonic, including the 1988–89 season when he was used primarily as a bench player. McDaniel made his only all-star appearance in 1988 with the SuperSonics as a reserve player.

Despite regular season success, the SuperSonics ultimately came up short in the postseason in each of McDaniel’s seasons. This, paired with tension among the team’s starters, such as McDaniel getting into a lengthy fist-fight with Dale Ellis, ultimately led to the SuperSonics opting for youth, and they traded McDaniel for two 1st round draft picks as well as Eddie Johnson.

Phoenix Suns
McDaniel was traded fifteen games into the 1990–91 season to the Phoenix Suns for Eddie Johnson and two draft picks. On December 21, 1990, McDaniel scored 18 points, recorded 5 steals, and recorded 5 assists, in a 132-128 overtime loss to the San Antonio Spurs.

The trade reunited him with teammate Tom Chambers, but it didn't produce the results the Suns were looking for. In October 1991, he was dealt to the New York Knicks for Trent Tucker, Jerrod Mustaf, and two 2nd round picks.

New York Knicks
In the Knicks he was a perfect fit in coach Pat Riley's physical style. He gained some notoriety for playing the Chicago Bulls' Scottie Pippen tough in a grueling seven-game playoff series that the Bulls won on their way to their second NBA title.

Boston Celtics
Dismayed with Knicks' subpar contract offer in the offseason, McDaniel signed with the Boston Celtics prior to the 1992–93 season. Dave Gavitt, the executive vice president for the Celtics claimed that “McDaniel wasn’t a perfect fit at his position but brought us something that would make us a better team” after signing McDaniel in free agency. During His three seasons with the Celtics, McDaniel averaged 11.3 points, 5.1 rebounds, and 1.3 assists per game.

Iraklis Thessaloniki
In 1995, McDaniel signed with Greek club Iraklis Thessaloniki. With Iraklis, he was a Greek Cup finalist, in March 1996. During the FIBA EuroLeague 1995–96 season, he averaged 18.4 points, 7.9 rebounds, and 1.4 assists per game. In the Greek Basketball League, he averaged 18.5 points, 9 rebounds and 38 minutes a game, playing in 24 of 26 games, being suspended for two.

New Jersey Nets
In October 1996, McDaniel signed with the New Jersey Nets. On March 15, 1997, McDaniel led the Nets to a win, making 4 free-throws in the final 16 seconds of a 99-98 victory over the Chicago Bulls. During his last two years with the New Jersey Nets, McDaniel’s numbers started to drop off and he ultimately decided to retire after the 1998 season.

Style of play 
McDaniel was known for his physical style of play on the court which he often used to intimidate other players. This caused McDaniel to get into many physical altercations during games and practices.

Post playing career 
After retiring from professional basketball, McDaniel moved back to his hometown of Columbia, South Carolina to be closer and reconnect with his family. He obtained a real estate license after retirement and likes flipping houses.

McDaniel owns a janitorial supply company in Columbia, South Carolina.

Television and film appearances
McDaniel had a brief cameo in the 1992 film Singles. One of the film's main characters, Steve Dunne (Campbell Scott), is having sex and begins fantasizing about a locker room interview with McDaniel in order to delay orgasm. At the end of the otherwise normal interview McDaniel says "Steve, don't cum yet." A year later McDaniel was featured on the sitcom Married... with Children in the episode "A Tisket, a Tasket, Can Peg Make a Basket?" McDaniel played an NBA All-Star who roughs up lead character Al Bundy after his wife pesters the All-Star during a basketball game.

After retiring McDaniel appeared on Spike TV's televised slamball games where he coached the Riders squad in 2003. Afterwards he made a few appearances on the  reality TV game show Pros vs. Joes in 2006. Xavier McDaniel played on the Orange "All-Star" Team with fellow NBA star Clyde Drexler on an episode of Pros vs. Joes, who coincidentally also appeared with McDaniel on the same Married... with Children episode 13 years earlier.

McDaniel also appeared on the MTV2 game show Pros vs. Joes, airing in 2006. Two joes beat McDaniel in a basketball competition.

Personal life
McDaniel is married to current Head Women's Basketball Coach at Harris-Stowe State University, Morra Gill McDaniel. They have 2 sons, Max Love and Dax Love. 
McDaniel's daughter, Xylina, a 6'2" forward, was one of 36 girls that were invited in June 2010 to participate in the United States Under-17 basketball team trials. She was the 2013 Atlantic Coast Conference Freshman of the Year for the North Carolina Tar Heels, where she played through 2016. His son, Xavier McDaniel Jr. won a state championship in 2015 for Hammond School, with former North Carolina guard Seventh Woods. Xavier Jr. played college basketball at the University of Texas Rio Grande Valley.

NBA career statistics

Regular season 

|-
| style="text-align:left;"| 
| style="text-align:left;"|Seattle
| 82 || 80 || 33.0 || .490 || .200 || .687 || 8.0 || 2.4 || 1.2 || .5 || 17.1
|-
| style="text-align:left;"| 
| style="text-align:left;"|Seattle
| 82 || 82 || 37.0 || .509 || .214 || .696 || 8.6 || 2.5 || 1.4 || .6 || 23.0
|-
| style="text-align:left;"| 
| style="text-align:left;"|Seattle
| 78 || 77 || 34.7 || .488 || .280 || .715 || 6.6 || 3.4 || 1.2 || .7 || 21.4
|-
| style="text-align:left;"| 
| style="text-align:left;"|Seattle
| 82 || 10 || 29.1 || .489 || .306 || .732 || 5.3 || 1.6 || 1.0 || .5 || 20.5
|-
| style="text-align:left;"| 
| style="text-align:left;"|Seattle
| 69 || 67 || 35.2 || .496 || .294 || .733 || 6.5 || 2.5 || 1.1 || .5 || 21.3
|-
| style="text-align:left;"| 
| style="text-align:left;"|Seattle-Phoenix
| 81 || 79 || 35.3 || .490 || .000 || .710 || 6.3 || 2.4 || 1.2 || .5 || 18.8
|-
| style="text-align:left;"| 
| style="text-align:left;"|New York
| 82 || 82 || 28.6 || .478 || .308 || .714 || 5.6 || 1.8 || .7 || .3 || 13.7
|-
| style="text-align:left;"| 
| style="text-align:left;"|Boston
| 82 || 27 || 27.0 || .495 || .273 || .793 || 6.0 || 2.0 || .9 || .6 || 13.5
|-
| style="text-align:left;"| 
| style="text-align:left;"|Boston
| 82 || 5 || 24.0 || .461 || .244 || .676 || 4.9 || 1.5 || .6 || .5 || 11.3
|-
| style="text-align:left;"| 
| style="text-align:left;"|Boston
| 68 || 15 || 21.0 || .451 || .286 || .712 || 4.4 || 1.6 || .4 || .3 || 8.6
|-
| style="text-align:left;"| 
| style="text-align:left;"|New Jersey
| 62 || 5 || 18.9 || .389 || .200 || .730 || 5.1 || 1.0 || .6 || .3 || 5.6
|-
| style="text-align:left;"| 
| style="text-align:left;"|New Jersey
| 20 || 0 || 9.0 || .333 || – || .625 || 1.6 || .5 || .2 || .1 || 1.3
|- class="sortbottom"
| style="text-align:center;" colspan="2"| Career
| 870 || 529 || 29.0 || .485 || .261 || .718 || 6.1 || 2.0 || .9 || .5 || 15.6
|- class="sortbottom"
| style="text-align:center;" colspan="2"| All-Star
| 1 || 0 || 13.0 || .111 || – || – || 2.0 || .0 || .0 || .0 || 2.0

Playoffs 

|-
|style="text-align:left;"|1987
|style="text-align:left;"|Seattle
|14||14||37.7||.488||.200||.607||8.4||3.0||1.5||.6||20.3
|-
|style="text-align:left;"|1988
|style="text-align:left;"|Seattle
|5||5||36.0||.556||.500||.500||9.6||5.0||.6||.2||21.2
|-
|style="text-align:left;"|1989
|style="text-align:left;"|Seattle
|8||8||35.1||.403||.333||.756||8.4||2.8||.3||.6||18.8
|-
|style="text-align:left;"|1991
|style="text-align:left;"|Phoenix
|4||4||25.3||.415||.000||.667||3.8||1.3||.0||.5||9.5
|-
|style="text-align:left;"|1992
|style="text-align:left;"|New York
|12||12||38.2||.477||.250||.735||7.2||1.9||.8||.2||18.8
|-
|style="text-align:left;"|1993
|style="text-align:left;"|Boston
|4||0||31.5||.415||.000||.667||4.5||2.3||.3||.8||12.5
|-
|style="text-align:left;"|1995
|style="text-align:left;"|Boston
|4||0||14.8||.294||.000||.750||1.5||1.3||.0||.0||3.3
|- class="sortbottom"
| style="text-align:center;" colspan="2"| Career
| 51 || 43 || 34.0 || .464 || .282 || .667 || 7.0 || 2.6 || .7 || .4 || 17.0

See also
 List of NCAA Division I men's basketball season rebounding leaders
 List of NCAA Division I men's basketball players with 2,000 points and 1,000 rebounds

References

External links

Sonics Q&A: Xavier McDaniel, by Kevin Pelton, SUPERSONICS.COM | August 17, 2006
Xavier McDaniel - No One Played Harder @ NBA.com

1963 births
Living people
A.C. Flora High School alumni
All-American college men's basketball players
American expatriate basketball people in Greece
American men's basketball players
Basketball players from Columbia, South Carolina
Boston Celtics players
Greek Basket League players
Iraklis Thessaloniki B.C. players
National Basketball Association All-Stars
National Collegiate Basketball Hall of Fame inductees
New Jersey Nets players
New York Knicks players
Phoenix Suns players
Power forwards (basketball)
Seattle SuperSonics draft picks
Seattle SuperSonics players
Small forwards
Wichita State Shockers men's basketball players